Mount Juliet may refer to:

 Mount Juliet, Tennessee, USA
 Mount Juliet Golf & Spa Hotel in Mount Juliet estate, Thomastown, County Kilkenny, Ireland
 Mount Juliet (Music City Star station), a station on Nashville's regional rail line
 Mount Juliet (British Columbia), a mountain on Vancouver Island, British Columbia, Canada
 Mount Juliet, a peak in the Yarra Ranges near Healesville, Australia